Attorney General Mullan may refer to:

Charles W. Mullan (1845–1919), Attorney General of Iowa
John Mullan (Australian politician) (1871–1941), Attorney-General of Queensland